Whiteson is an unincorporated community in Yamhill County, Oregon, United States. Oregon Geographic Names states that Whiteson is named for either for Henry White, who laid out the town site and gave the railroad right-of-way, or for William White. It is possible they are members of the same family. Whiteson post office was established in 1890. Whiteson is an agricultural community lacking either Oregon hamlet or village classification, and relies on the neighboring communities of McMinnville and Amity for basic services such as fire, health, and education. The Yamhill County Sheriff has primary police jurisdiction over Whiteson.

Geography 
Whiteson is located 3 miles south of McMinnville, on Oregon Route 99W, near Whiteson Dip Bridge.

Climate
This region experiences warm (but not hot) and dry summers, with no average monthly temperatures above 71.6 °F.  According to the Köppen Climate Classification system, Whiteson has a warm-summer Mediterranean climate, abbreviated "Csb" on climate maps.

Education 
Whiteson School District 78 was established in 1892, and the first one-room schoolhouse was finished in the March 1893. In 1903 the decision was made to create an addition to the Whiteson school, making it a two-room school. 1936 was the last year school was taught here, before the district finally consolidated with Amity School District 4, in 1942.

Rail transport 
Whiteson railway station is the railway station, where the Dayton, Sheridan and Grande Ronde Railroad crossed the west side line of the Oregon and California Railroad.

Whiteson was formerly a notable station along the Red Electric interurban network. Initial service extended from Portland to Whiteson, but eventually reached Corvallis in 1917. By 1920, the schedule had four daily trains through from Portland to Corvallis in each direction and two more that ran as far as Whiteson.

References 

Unincorporated communities in Yamhill County, Oregon
Unincorporated communities in Oregon